|}

This is a list of electoral division results for the Northern Territory 2008 General Election.

Results by Electoral Division

Arafura

Araluen

Arnhem 

The 2008 election in Arnhem was uncontested with one candidate nominating.

Barkly

Blain

Braitling

Brennan

Casuarina

Daly

Drysdale

Fannie Bay

Fong Lim

Goyder

Greatorex

Johnston

Karama

Katherine

Macdonnell 

The 2008 election in Macdonnell was uncontested with one candidate nominating.

Nelson

Nhulunbuy

Nightcliff

Port Darwin

Sanderson

Stuart

Wanguri

See also 

 2008 Northern Territory general election

References 

Results of Northern Territory elections